Mycobacterium genavense is a slow-growing species of the phylum Actinomycetota (Gram-positive bacteria with high guanine and cytosine content, one of the dominant phyla of all bacteria), belonging to the genus Mycobacterium.

Description

Nonmotile, acid-fast coccobacilli (1.0 µm x 2.0 µm). No formation of spores, capsules or aerial hyphae.

Colony characteristics
Tiny, transparent, nonphotochromogenic and dysgonic colonies (on solid Middlebrook 7H11 medium  MJ (Allied Laboratories).

Physiology
Slow, fastidious growth in liquid media within 3–12 weeks at 31 °C, 37 °C and 42 °C, with slightly better growth at 45 °C.
 Primary cultures for isolation require liquid broth media such as BACTEC 12B medium, Middlebrook 7H9 medium.
Acid broth media such as, BACTEC pyrazinamidase test medium, may facilitate primary isolation.
No growth on standard solid media like Löwenstein-Jensen, unsupplemented Middlebrook 7H11 or Middlebrook 7H10 media.
Visible growth on solid Middlebrook 7H11 medium supplemented with MJ after inoculation with a broth culture within 3–9 weeks.
Susceptible to streptomycin and rifampicin
Resistant to isoniazid

Differential characteristics
Differentiation from other slowly growing mycobacteria by its fastidious growth.
Closely related to M. simiae by evaluation of 16S rDNA sequences.

Pathogenesis
Opportunistic pathogen. Clinically indistinguishable from generalised infections in patients with AIDS due to M. avium complex strains, but more related to gastro-intestinal disorders.
Most common cause of mycobacterial disease in parrots and parakeets.

Type strain
Strain 2289 = ATCC 51234

References

Böttger et al. 1993. Mycobacterium genavense sp. nov. Int. J. Syst. Bacteriol., 43, 841–843.

Acid-fast bacilli
genavense
Bacteria described in 1993